Min Bilu (Arakanese:မင်းဘီလူး, is the 7th monarch of Laungyet Dynasty of Arakan.

Reign 
Min Bilu succeeded his father,Nankyakyi who had been assassinated on his way from Mahamuni Temple to the capital due to the tyrannical rule.
As for a newly king, he was very unpopular and more hateful than his father throughout his reign simply for its abused power, neglecting religious duties and even cast away his infant son Min Hti, lucky the child was miraculously preserved.  
Widespread acts of tyrannies he committed, he was eventually killed in coup led by Sithabin I.

References 

Monarchs of Launggyet
13th-century Burmese monarchs